Martha Mackintosh (born 1992) is an English actress best known for playing Katie Jackson in the Sky1 TV comedy drama series Stella. She is the daughter of actors Steven Mackintosh and Lisa Jacobs.

Filmography

Film

Television

Video games

Audiobooks

References

External links
 

Living people
Place of birth missing (living people)
English film actresses
English television actresses
English video game actresses
1992 births